Murello is a comune (municipality) in the Province of Cuneo in the Italian region Piedmont, located about  south of Turin and about  north of Cuneo.

Murello borders the following municipalities: Cavallerleone, Moretta, Polonghera, Racconigi, Ruffia, and Villanova Solaro.

Demographic evolution

References 

Cities and towns in Piedmont